Avance  may refer to:

 Avance (Durance), a tributary of the Durance, France
 Avance (Garonne), a tributary of the Garonne, France
 Avance, South Dakota, a ghost town
 Avance (newspaper), a newspaper published in Nicaragua, the central organ of the Communist Party of Nicaragua
 Avance (non-profit organization)